San José Las Flores is a settlement in Santa Ana Department, El Salvador.

References

Populated places in El Salvador